Kaka Bhaniawala (ਕਾਕਾ ਭੈਣੀਆਂਵਾਲਾ); born Santokh Singh Rataurh; (5 April 1970– 12 April 2009) was a Punjabi singer from a village in the state of Punjab, India called Doaba Bhaini, near Kohara on Chandigarh - Ludhiana road, represented within his name, meaning from Bhaini (Bhaniawala). The name 'Kaka' was a nickname presented to him by his mother which he then took upon to be signature name on the stage. His debut album with Music Pearls Recording Company Ludhiana is Mashooq Teri Challi.

Musical career
Kaka started out singing in India with released his debut music album with "Music Pearls Company", Ludhiana which brought him local success. The song Sahnewal Chowk, written by Kaler Gahi Bhaini, a lyricist residing near his village, brought him success later in his career was from the debut album. He later started singing for UK producers, such Bally Rai. His major breakthrough in the UK Bhangra music came through the release of "Sahnevaal Chowk" Remix, the title track on the debut album of Specialist 'N' Tru-Skool, Word Is Born.

Following on from his success from that Sahnewal Chowk Remix, he went on to work with many other producers and continued his success. His solo album was in the process of being completed when he died. This album is still currently being completed and is due to release in 2015. It will feature production from the likes of Notorious Jatt, Tru-Skool, AMX and others.

He has had many successful hits with many famous artists including, DJ H & DJ Rags, with his sole UK Singles Chart dent providing lead vocals for Nachna Onda Nei, which made No. 62 after being used in performances by Signature in the talent show Britain's Got Talent.

Death
On 12 April 2009, it was announced that Bhaniawala had died of jaundice from liver failure in Ludhiana after going through a routine blood treatment. This was due to excessive drinking. The loss was mourned by many in the bhangra industry and came as shock to many fans who did not expect the sudden loss.

Legacy
After his death, a concert was held in Birmingham to raise money for his family based in India. Famous singers and producers from around the world came together to pay tribute. After his death, numerous songs and albums were released featuring his voice as well as his presence in some of the music videos.

Posthumous albums

Singles

References

1971 births
2009 deaths
20th-century Indian singers
Singers from Punjab, India
20th-century Indian male singers